During the 2004–05 English football season, Crewe Alexandra F.C. competed in the Football League Championship, their 82nd in the English Football League.

Season summary
At the start of the 2004–05 season, Crewe were rated one of the likeliest teams to be relegated. In the event, they put in a good showing in the first half of the season; comfortably in the top half of the table, but after selling Dean Ashton to Norwich City for a record £3 million in the January 2005 transfer window, Crewe failed to win any more games until the final match of the season, when they defeated Coventry City 2–1 and narrowly escaped relegation on goal difference.

Final league table

Results
Crewe Alexandra's score comes first

Legend

Football League Championship

FA Cup

League Cup

Squad

Left club during season

References

Crewe Alexandra F.C. seasons
Crewe Alexandra F.C.